Maria Chudnovsky (born January 6, 1977) is an Israeli-American mathematician working on graph theory and combinatorial optimization.  She is a 2012 MacArthur Fellow.

Education and career
Chudnovsky is a professor in the department of mathematics at Princeton University. She grew up in Russia (attended Saint Petersburg Lyceum 30) and Israel, studying at the Technion, and received her Ph.D. in 2003 from Princeton University under the supervision of Paul Seymour. After postdoctoral research at the Clay Mathematics Institute, she became an assistant professor at Princeton University in 2005, and moved to Columbia University in 2006. By 2014, she was the Liu Family Professor of Industrial Engineering and Operations Research at Columbia. She returned to Princeton as a professor of mathematics in 2015.

Research

Chudnovsky's contributions to graph theory include the proof of the strong perfect graph theorem (with Neil Robertson, Paul Seymour, and Robin Thomas) characterizing perfect graphs as being exactly the graphs with no odd induced cycles of length at least 5 or their complements. Other research contributions of Chudnovsky include co-authorship of the first polynomial-time algorithm for recognizing perfect graphs (time bounded by a polynomial of degree 9), and of a structural characterization of the claw-free graphs.

Selected publications
.
.
.

Awards and honors
In 2004 Chudnovsky was named one of the "Brilliant 10" by Popular Science magazine. Her work on the strong perfect graph theorem won for her and her co-authors the 2009 Fulkerson Prize.
In 2012 she was awarded a "genius award" under the MacArthur Fellows Program.

Personal life
She is a citizen of Israel and a permanent resident of the US.

In 2012, she married Daniel Panner, a viola player who teaches at Mannes School of Music and the Juilliard School. They have a son named Rafael.

References

External links
Chudnovsky's home page at Princeton University

Living people
Graph theorists
Princeton University alumni
Princeton University faculty
Columbia University faculty
Israeli mathematicians
Women mathematicians
1977 births
MacArthur Fellows
Combinatorialists